Jacmaia is a genus of flowering plants in the daisy family. This generic name is an anagram derived from Jamaica.

Systematics
The genus Jacmaia comprises only one recognized species, Jacmaia incana, native to Jamaica.

The following species, formerly included in Jacmaia, are now subsumed in Jessea and Odontocline:
 Jacmaia cooperi (Greenm.) C.Jeffrey - Jessea cooperi (Greenm.) H.Rob. & Cuatrec.
 Jacmaia laciniata (Sw.) C.Jeffrey - Odontocline laciniata (Sw.) B.Nord.
 Jacmaia megaphylla (Greenm.) C.Jeffrey - Jessea megaphylla (Greenm.) H.Rob. & Cuatrec.
 Jacmaia multivenia  (Benth.) C.Jeffrey - Jessea multivenia (Benth. ex Benth.) H.Rob. & Cuatrec.

References

Monotypic Asteraceae genera
Senecioneae
Flora of Jamaica